Erlenbach may refer to several places:

Switzerland 
Erlenbach, Switzerland, a Canton of Zurich
Erlenbach im Simmental, a Canton of Berne

Germany 
Erlenbach, Baden-Württemberg, a municipality in the district of Heilbronn, Baden-Württemberg
Erlenbach bei Dahn, a municipality in Südwestpfalz district, Rhineland-Palatinate
Erlenbach bei Kandel, a municipality in the district of Germersheim, Rhineland-Palatinate
Erlenbach bei Marktheidenfeld, a community in the district Main-Spessart, Bavaria
Erlenbach am Main, a town in the district of Miltenberg, Bavaria
Nieder-Erlenbach, a neighborhood of Frankfurt am Main, Hesse

Rivers
Erlenbach (Enz), in Baden-Württemberg, tributary of the Enz
Erlenbach (Jagst), in Baden-Württemberg, tributary of the Jagst
Erlenbach (Bever), in North Rhine-Westphalia, tributary of the Bever
Erlenbach (Hillersbach), in Hesse, tributary of the Hillersbach
Erlenbach (Nidda), in Hesse, tributary of the Nidda
Erlenbach (Nidder), in Hesse, tributary of the Nidder
Erlenbach (Speyerbach), in Rhineland-Palatinate, headwater of the Speyerbach
Erlenbach (Michelsbach), in southern Rhineland-Palatinate, tributary of the Michelsbach
Erlenbach (Lauter), in southern Rhineland-Palatinate, tributary of the Lauter
Erlenbach (Kahl), in Bavaria, tributary of the Kahl
Erlenbach (Laufach), in Bavaria, tributary of the Laufach
Erlenbach (Main), in Bavaria, tributary of the Main
Erlenbach (Mindel), in Bavaria, tributary of the Mindel

Other uses
 Erlenbach or Albé, a commune in the Bas Rhin département in Alsace
 SV Erlenbach, a German association football club Erlenbach am Main, Bavaria
 Erlenbach ZH railway station, in Switzerland